Venados Fútbol Club is a Mexican football club based in Mérida, Yucatán. The team are currently playing in the Liga de Expansión MX, the second tier of the Mexican football league system. For the Clausura 2011 season they became the filial team of Atlante, whilst until that point they had been the subsidiary team of Monarcas Morelia.

History

Origins and first Merida franchise
The team emerged in 1988 as the "Venados de Yucatan", when Mr. Jorge Arana Palma, acquires the franchise of the Second Division of the Alacranes de Apatzingán, and it is during this stage when the colors that would identify them to this day are defined, green, yellow and white. During this first season, they were runner-up in the Second Division in the 1988-89 season and the First Division 'A' championship in 1998.

Return of the Mérida
Mérida F.C. was returned in 2003 by the brothers Arturo and Mauricio Millet Reyes, who obtained the franchise of Nacional de Tijuana.

Loss of franchise in 2005 and continuation at lower levels
After the Clausura 2005 tournament, the Millet brothers announced that they would be selling the team to Irapuato FC due to economic problems, citing lackluster attendance and poor support from the local government. Nevertheless, the brothers formed a team that participated in an amateur league in Yucatán and also opened a training facility in Argentina to scout local talent. Mérida F.C. returned to the professional ranks when they participated in the Tercera División in 2006/07. During 2007, the brothers oversaw the construction of a training facility located at the Unidad Deportiva Tamanché. By the 2007/08 season Mérida was participating in the Segunda División.

Return of second level franchise with Morelia
On June 16, 2008, Arturo Millet Reyes announced that he had acquired the filial team of Morelia. Millet Reyes has stated that his intention is to maintain the team in Mérida for an extended period of time, unlike in previous years. He also received a guarantee that if the Venados were to be promoted to the Primera División that the team would remain in Mérida.

On November 11, 2008, the Federación Mexicana de Fútbol Asociación (FMF) granted the club the certification required to be promoted to the Primera División.

In the Clausura 2009 season Mérida defeated Club Tijuana 1–0 on aggregate to win the Clausura title. Mérida lost the subsequent promotion play-off for the Primera Division de Mexico, after a defeat by Querétaro FC on penalties.

Sale of franchise to Atlante
On 4 December 2010 the brothers Arturo and Mauricio Millet Reyes announced that Mérida F.C. would no longer form part of the Liga de Ascenso and that Monarcas Morelia would decide if a team would stay in the city, but that talks were also underway with Atlante F.C. regarding the creation of a link with them.

The Mérida franchise was subsequently sold to Atlante and they became that team's filial team for the Clausura 2011, whilst the original Atlante filial team (Atlante UTN) swapped franchises to become the subsidiary team for Morelia.

Ascenso MX Changes 2015 and Rebranding 
The Mexican Football Federation said the Apertura 2015 tournament will be 16 teams who play the Ascenso MX instead of 14, as it was in recent tournaments. In addition, two clubs change city and state to the next season.

Estudiantes de Altamira will become Cafetaleros of Tapachula, whose headquarters will be the Olympic Stadium in Tapachula, in Chiapas; while Irapuato become Murcielagos FC and will play in Los Mochis, Sinaloa at the Estadio Centenario.

In addition to these changes, there will be two new franchises, that of Cimarrones de Sonora, located in Heroes de Nacozari Stadium de Hermosillo. As the FC Juárez will use Benito Juarez Olympic Stadium.

Finally, FC Mérida now be changing logo and will be called Venados FC (keeping the venue in Mérida).

This could mean that the Venados FC team is the "rebirth" of Venados de Yucatán franchise .

Stadium 

The home stadium for Venados F.C. is the Estadio Carlos Iturralde.

Atlético Yucatán

Atlético Yucatán was a Mexican football club based in Mérida, Yucatán, México.  The club played in the Primera A for most of their existence.

The club was founded in 1988 the same year it joined the Segunda División Profesional.  In their first years in 1988–89, the club would reach the finals against Potros Neza.  The clubs tied in the first two games 2–2. Neza would come out with a 3–0 victory in the third match.

In 1998 the club reached the final against Chivas Tijuana, where the club won 1–0 in Mérida.  In 1999, the club played their promotion match against Unión de Curtidores but lost 7–1.

Honors
Primera división 'A' Mexicana: 1
1998

Segunda División Profesional: 0
Runner-up (1): 1988–89

Personnel

Management

Coaching staff

Players

First-team squad

Out on loan

Reserve teams

Cantera Venados
Reserve team that plays in the Liga TDP, the fourth level of the Mexican league system.

Progreso F.C.
Affiliate team that plays in the Liga TDP, the fourth level of the Mexican league system.

Managers
 David Patiño (2008–2010)
 Mario García (2011)
 Ricardo Valiño (2011–2014)
 Juan Carlos Chávez (2014–2015)
 Daniel Rossello (Interim) (2015)
 Marcelo Michel Leaño (2016)
 José Luis Sánchez Solá (2016–2017)
 Bruno Marioni (2017–2018)
 Joel Sánchez (2018)
 Sergio Orduña (2018–2019)
 Carlos Gutiérrez (2020–2022)
 Andrés Carevic (2022)

Honours

Domestic tournaments
Primera División A
Clausura 2009

Segunda División
Apertura 2008

References

External links 
 Official Site 
 Club changes

Football clubs in Yucatán
Ascenso MX teams
2003 establishments in Mexico
Association football clubs established in 2003